Ñorquín is a department located in the north of Neuquén Province, Argentina.

Geography
The Department limits with Minas Department at the Northwest, Chos Malal Department at the northeast, Pehuenches Department at east, Loncopué Department at south and Chile at east.

Departments of Neuquén Province